Bonnie Gadusek (born September 11, 1963) is a retired American professional tennis player.

Career
Gadusek started a career in gymnastics, training for the 1980 Olympics, but fell from uneven parallel bars and landed on her neck, dislocating two vertebrae. While recovering from her injuries, she took up tennis as part of her therapy. She played in her first junior tournament wearing a brace. She was named Junior of the Year in 1980 and Player of the Year in 1981 by the Florida Tennis Association. She won the 1981 French Open girls’ singles championship.

Gadusek played on the WTA Tour from 1981 to 1987. She was named Rookie of the Year in 1982. She won five singles and three doubles titles before retiring. The right-hander reached her highest career ranking on July 9, 1984 when she became the world No. 8. Her best Grand Slam finishes were two quarterfinals at the US Open in 1982 and 1986.

Gadusek had career wins over Billie Jean King, Andrea Jaeger, Sue Barker, Hana Mandlíková, Manuela Maleeva, Wendy Turnbull, Gabriela Sabatini, Dianne Fromholtz, Claudia Kohde-Kilsch, Helena Suková, Zina Garrison, Mary Joe Fernandez, Sylvia Hanika, Jo Durie, and Rosie Casals. During her career, she was coached by renowned Australian coach Harry Hopman.

Gadusek was a member of the 1986 Wightman Cup Team. She helped coach the 1987 Wightman Cup Team. She retired with a 169–95 win–loss record.

WTA career finals

Singles: 10 (5 titles, 5 runner-ups)

Doubles: 6 (3 titles, 3 runner-ups)

Grand Slam singles performance timeline

References

External links
 
 

1963 births
Living people
American female tennis players
French Open junior champions
People from Punta Gorda, Florida
Tennis people from Florida
Tennis players from Pittsburgh
Grand Slam (tennis) champions in girls' singles
21st-century American women